The 1999–2000 Second League of FR Yugoslavia season (Serbian: Druga liga Jugoslavije) consisted of three groups of 18 teams.

Originally 14 teams from 7 groups of Third Division would be promoted, but in the end only 13 teams remained (only one of which was from the Timok Group). It was not necessary to relegate one team from Second League East, as Crvena Zvezda Gnjilane had already withdrawn.

Due to the formation of South Group (Montenegro), no team were relegated in West Group.

League table

North (Vojvodina & Belgrade)

East

Crvena Zvezda Gnjilane withdrew at the start of season

West

Yugoslav Second League seasons
Yugo
2